is a female Japanese manga artist.

Works
Futakoi Alternative
Mahō no Jyumon
Otome wa Boku ni Koishiteru

External links
  
 Kanao Araki at Media Arts Database 

Manga artists
Living people
Year of birth missing (living people)
Place of birth missing (living people)